John Bell Thomson (1835?–1896) was a notable New Zealand police officer and detective. He was born in London, England in about 1835.

References

1835 births
1896 deaths
New Zealand police officers
English emigrants to New Zealand